Henrya is a genus of flowering plants belonging to the family Acanthaceae.

Its native range is Arizona to Central America. It is found in the countries of Costa Rica, El Salvador, Guatemala, Honduras, Mexico, Nicaragua and Panamá.

The genus name of Henrya is in honour of Aimé Constant Fidèle Henry (1801–1875), a French-born German bookseller in Bonn and member of the German National Academy of Sciences Leopoldina. It was first described and published in G.Bentham, Bot. Voy. Sulphur on page 148 in 1846.

Known species, according to Kew:
Henrya insularis 
Henrya scorpioides 
Henrya tuberculosperma

References

Acanthaceae
Acanthaceae genera
Plants described in 1846
Flora of South America